Empis albinervis  is a species of fly in the family Empididae. It is included in the subgenus Coptophlebia of the genus Empis. It is found in the  Palearctic.

References

External links
Images representing Empis at BOLD

Empis
Insects described in 1822
Asilomorph flies of Europe